This is a list of universities in the Cayman Islands:

Cayman Islands Law School: A law school affiliated with the University of Liverpool in the U.K. 
International College of the Cayman Islands: A private university. 
St. Matthews University: A private institution containing a medical school and a veterinary school. 
University College of the Cayman Islands: The only public university in the Cayman Islands. 
University of the West Indies Open Campus: Affiliated with UWI Jamaica. http://www.open.uwi.edu/cayman_islands
Cayman Institute of Technology: http://cit.edu.ky

Cayman Islands
Universities
 List
Universities in the Cayman Islands
Cayman Islands